Knife Party are an Australian electronic music duo consisting of Rob Swire and Gareth McGrillen, two members of the drum and bass band Pendulum.

The duo has worked with artists such as Swedish House Mafia, Steve Aoki, MistaJam, Foreign Beggars, I See MONSTAS, Tom Staar, Pegboard Nerds and Tom Morello.

Knife Party peaked at 23rd on DJMag's 2013 Top 100 DJs rankings.

History

2002–2010: Origin
Rob Swire and Gareth McGrillen met in 2002 and have since performed music in various different bands and music projects. They along with Paul Harding formed the drum and bass band Pendulum.  The duo started Knife Party as a side project to Pendulum. However, after the project's success and mass popularity, Knife Party became their primary project.

The name is derived from the Deftones song "Knife Prty" featured on the 2000 album White Pony. Knife Party's name caused consternation at first, as some said the name showed support for knife crime. Rob Swire rebutted this during an interview stating "...we’re not advocating any type of knife-related crime any more than Swedish House Mafia were advocating organised crime."

2011–2012: 100% No Modern Talking and Rage Valley

On 25 May 2011, Swire previewed a teaser of a Knife Party remix on SoundCloud labeled "Not Pendulum", which later turned out to be their remix of Swedish House Mafia's "Save the World".

Knife Party's first EP, 100% No Modern Talking, was released digitally through Warner Bros. Records on 12 December 2011. The EP originally was to feature "Back to the Z-List" but was replaced with "Destroy Them with Lazers" as the duo had decided to abandon the track. The EP title refers to the lack of "Modern Talking", a wavetable in the software synthesiser NI Massive commonly used to create "talking" basslines.

Their second EP, Rage Valley, was released digitally through EarStorm and Big Beat. It was made available for purchase on Beatport and iTunes on 27 May 2012.

The song "Bonfire", released on this EP, was featured on an episode of AMC's Breaking Bad and in the video game WWE 2K15 (the latter of which features the instrumental version on its official soundtrack). The EP was also Knife Party's first ever entry on the Billboard 200, peaking at 75.

2013–2014: Haunted House and Abandon Ship
Their third EP Haunted House, was released on 6 May 2013 digitally through EarStorm and Big Beat. The EP was leaked on 29 April 2013 and was uploaded in its officially on 5 May 2013. The EP entered into the iTunes Top 10 Albums Chart and peaked at 3. It also hit number 1 Electro House Album on Beatport. The EP was also Knife Party's first Top 40 entry on the Billboard 200, peaking at 37.

In May 2014 Swire stated that the debut Knife Party album was near completion and that they were in their final stages of finishing it. In June it was announced that the album would be titled Abandon Ship.

"Resistance" the first single off the album was released on 25 August 2014. The album was scheduled for release on 24 November 2014. The second promotional single, "Begin Again", was released on 22 September 2014 and the song entered the UK Singles Chart at number 183.

On 7 November 2014, iTunes accidentally released Abandon Ship early, causing Knife Party to have to release the album early on all platforms. Knife Party's Rob Swire mentioned in a tweet that he was happy with the album leaking, but that he felt it made "months of arguments about release dates and watermarks pointless."

2015–2016: Trigger Warning and Battle Sirens
Evidence of a possible new EP made itself known during their performance at Ultra Music Festival 2015 where they debuted three new tracks: Parliament Funk, PLUR Police and Kraken ft. Tom Staar.

On 13 November Knife Party tweeted on their official Twitter page that they will be releasing the EP on 20 November 2015.

At Kingsday Festival 2015 they premiered a brand new collaboration with Tom Morello of Rage Against the Machine. During Ultra Music Festival 2016, Knife Party closed out the festival and brought out Tom Morello to perform a live version of the collaboration. The track was later announced to be titled "Battle Sirens" and released worldwide on 9 September 2016. Official remixes by Brillz and Ephwurd were released shortly after as well as a Live version from the Ultra performance. The original and remixes were collected together in an EP release on 2 December 2016.

2017–2018: Knifecast Begins and Singles
At  a Life in Color event held in Manchester on 3 February 2018, they played out a remix of Pendulum's "Blood Sugar" that was released with the Pendulum's Reworks album launching 16 March and releasing in full on 29 June 2018.

On 10 May 2018 Rob revealed the existence of a Pegboard Nerds collaboration on Twitter. This collaboration was eventually titled "Harpoon" and released as part of the Pegboard Nerds' Full Hearts EP in July.

The subreddit, r/electronnicmusic, hosted an AMA with Rob Swire discussing upcoming songs and miscellaneous topics on On 13 July 2018

Rob and Gareth premiered their live radio show titled "Knifecast" on 20 September 2018. The show was a mix "between a podcast and just playing music". At the end of the episode they premiered a new Dubstep ID, titled Lost Souls.

During their eighth Knifecast podcast on 16 November 2018, Rob and Gareth premiered another new track tentatively named "Ghost Town", which eventually became "Death & Desire", and showcased several previous versions of the track.

2019–present: Lost Souls
On 17 April 2019, Knife Party previewed the track "Ghost Train", a minimal tech house track, from their EP Lost Souls on the 13th episode of their podcast. The tracklist for the "Lost Souls" The EP also included the tracks "No Saint", "Lost Souls", and "Death & Desire" (featuring Harrison), and was released on 19 July. The EP debuted at No. 7 on the US Billboard Dance/Electronic Album Sales chart in August. The song "Death & Desire" debuted at No. 35 on Billboards Dance/Mix Show Airplay chart on 14 December. In addition to four tracks, Muzz's remix of "Ghost Train", Laidback Luke's remix of "Death & Desire" and Annix's remix of "Lost Souls" were also released.

Production
Knife Party use the digital audio workstation application Nuendo for production. In an interview with Sound on sound Swire mentions he used to use Logic Pro, but switched to Nuendo, mainly due to the linking system and workflow environment. Most of the sounds emulated are virtual instruments (VST). They also use outboard gear such as Tube-Tech SMC 2B Stereo Multi-Band Compressor.

Discography

Studio albums

Extended plays

Singles

Remixes

Production credits

Awards and nominations

ARIA Music Awards
The ARIA Music Awards is an annual awards ceremony that recognises excellence, innovation, and achievement across all genres of Australian music.

|-
| 2012 || "Rage Valley" || ARIA Award for Best Dance Release || 
|-

DJ Magazine top 100 DJs

Notes

References

External links
 

2011 establishments in Australia
 Ableton Live users
 Australian electronic music groups
 Australian house music groups
Australian musical duos
 Dubstep musicians
 Electronic dance music duos
 Moombahcore musicians
 Musical groups established in 2011
 Musical groups from Perth, Western Australia
Monstercat artists